Romanno Bridge is a village on the Lyne Water, on the A701, in the Scottish Borders area of Scotland.

Settlements nearby include West Linton, Halmyre, Dolphinton, Blyth Bridge, and Mountain Cross. The village is served by a community centre (the Newlands Centre), a small primary school (Newlands Primary) and a church (Kirkurd and Newlands Parish Church of Scotland).

See also
List of places in the Scottish Borders
List of places in Scotland

External links

CANMORE/RCAHMS record for Romanno Bridge
CANMORE/RCAHMS record for Old Romanno Bridge
CANMORE/RCAHMS record for Romanno Bridge, Toll House
SCRAN image: Lyne Water south of Romannobridge
SCRAN image: Former woollen mill, Romanno Bridge
Egg production at Blythebank Farm near Romannobridge
History of Romanno Bridge

Villages in the Scottish Borders